Fartman can refer to
 Fartman (Howard Stern), a flatulent superhero
 Matshishkapeu, literally "Fart Man", in Innu mythology